XHRHV-FM is a noncommercial radio station on 89.1 FM in Chalma, Veracruz, known as Macro Radio.

History
In 2011, "La Chalmerita", an unauthorized radio station, began operation on 89.1 MHz from the Chalma municipal hall. It was the first FM radio station in an area without broadcast television or cellular service. As the station was unauthorized, it was shut down during an SCT visit in March 2011.

Given that La Chalmerita was the only station in the area and its loss was a major blow for the community, members of the community decided to form a civil association and seek a permit to begin licensed operations. They succeeded in 2015, when the IFT awarded La Chalmerita a social use concession for a radio station on 89.1 MHz in Chalma, with the callsign XHRHV-FM.

References

Radio stations in Veracruz
Radio stations established in 2015